Mostaganem is a port city in and capital of Mostaganem province, in the northwest of Algeria. The city, founded in the 11th century lies on the Gulf of Arzew, Mediterranean Sea and is 72 km ENE of Oran. It is considered as the second-largest city in the country's northwest, after Oran, and as Algeria's fourth-largest port city with its 457,986 inhabitants as of the 2018 census.

The city was founded in the 11th century as Murustage but has origins going back to Punic and Roman times. In 1516, it was captured by the Ottoman admiral Barbarossa and became a centre for Mediterranean sea corsairs, as well as a commercial port. By 1700, it had come under Ottoman rule. In 1833, the city was taken by France and a garrison established. Algeria became independent in 1962.

History 

Mostaganem corresponds to the ancient Punic port of Murustaga. After becoming part of the Roman Empire, it was, according to some sources, officially renamed Cartennae under the emperor Gallienus (253–268). However, according to more weighty sources, Cartennae (or Cartenna or Cartennas) corresponds instead to modern Ténès, 50 km to the east.<ref>[https://books.google.com/books?id=Rq8mBAAAQBAJ&dq=Cartennae+T%C3%A9n%C3%A8s&pg=PA84 François Decret, Early Christianity in North Africa (James Clarke & Co. 2014] ), p. 84</ref> In any case, Murustaga is the name by which the town was known when it became a Christian bishopric, and by which it is referred to in the Catholic Church's list of episcopal sees. It also underlies the modern name of Mostaganem.

The town was ruled by the Zirid dynasty between 973–1146. Then, it was conquered by the Almoravid dynasty, and reached its high point of power under Yusuf ibn Tashfin (c. 1061–1106). Mostaganem was later ruled by the Zayyanid dynasty of Tlemcen and it was conquered again by the Marinid dynasty of Fes. After that the Zayyanid dynasty took control of the city again. 
In the 16th century, the town resisted a Spanish invasion and came under the power of the Ottoman Hayreddin Barbarossa.

Climate

Mostaganem has a mild semi-arid climate (Köppen climate classification BSk''). In winter there is more rainfall than in summer. About  of precipitation falls annually.

Present situation 

The city is divided in two by a ravine of the river Aïn Sefra, with the modern town to southwest, and the old Muslim city, Tidgit, to the northeast.

In 2010 a tunnel under the city and towards the city centre is expected to change traffic flow significantly. Also, new buildings, some modern and some in colonial style, are being added to this growing city. The new autoroute from the capital Algiers towards Oran will make it easier also to access Mostaganem by road from the capital, as Mostaganem has no public airport. The road connecting Oran (around 80 km from Mostaganem to the west) will remain the same, a crowded 2 lane in each direction highway.

The port of Mostaganem is being used for unloading of all sorts of cargo, ranging from provisions to cars and pipelines. As in most ports of Algeria, it is not allowed to sailors to exit the port and visit the city. The port is being shared by large transport vessels and fishing boats alike. A new, smaller port for fishing boats has been constructed, but is currently not used.

Image Gallery

Notable people

Mostaganem has given birth to illustrious figures such as playwright Ould Abderrahmane Abdelkader AKA Kaki, cinema director Mohamed Chouikh, historians such as Moulay Belhamissi, and lyricists such as Kadda Medjeded. A major centre of popular and amateur theater, it is home to important specialists of Andalusian classical music (Moulay Benkrizi), Chaabi (Maazouz Bouadjadj, Habib Bettahar), masters of traditional Bedouin music (Sheikh Hamada, Sheikh Djilali Ain Tedeles) and poets such as Sheikh Abdelkader Bentobdji and Sidi Lakhdar Benkhelouf who are authors of well-known qasida of Malhun poetry bequeathed as much to the Chaabi legacy as to Bedouins such as Emir `Abd al-Qādir al-Jazā'irī. Muhammad ibn Ali as-Senussi was originally from near Mostaganem.

Furthermore, one of the most notable religious figures of the 20th century was also born and later buried in Mostaganem, the Great Sufi Master, Ahmad al-Alawi, who played a major role in spreading the Shadhili Darqawi tariqa (spiritual order) across the globe, such that this order is now considered one of the world's largest and most influential Sufi paths. Many modern Muslims consider al-Alawi to be one of the "revivers" of Islam in the 20th century due to his role in spreading the religion, and even influencing the West, including opening the first mosque in Paris. Al-Alawi's tomb is now a popular visitation sight in Mostaganem.

 Louis Franchet d'Espèrey, French general, was born in Mostaganem in 1856.
 Alain-Julien Rudefoucauld, French writer and playwright was born in Mostaganem in 1950.
 Ishak Belfodil, (born 12 January 1992) is an Algerian professional football player

See also
 Mostaganem Airport

References

External links 

 Mostaganem dz by Mohammed Abbassa 
 History and old postcards of Algeria
 Annals of Heritage (Journal of the University)
 Mostaganem pictures and many things by S. Benhenda
 Mostaganem Its History, Photograph, Current events, Culture, Geography

Populated places in Mostaganem Province
Coastal cities in Algeria
Cities in Algeria
Province seats of Algeria